Milera is a surname. Notable people with the surname include:

 Terry Milera (born 1988), Australian rules footballer 
 Wayne Milera (born 1997), Australian rules footballer